Alan Lohniský (born 1 November 1963) is a Czechoslovak sprint canoer who competed for Czechoslovakia in the late 1980s. He won a bronze medal in the C-2 500 m event at the 1987 ICF Canoe Sprint World Championships in Duisburg.

Lohniský also finished ninth in the C-2 500 m event at the 1988 Summer Olympics in Seoul.

References

External links
 
 
 

1963 births
Canoeists at the 1988 Summer Olympics
Czechoslovak male canoeists
Living people
Olympic canoeists of Czechoslovakia
ICF Canoe Sprint World Championships medalists in Canadian
People from Vysoké Mýto
Sportspeople from the Pardubice Region